The following are notable people who were either born, raised or have lived for a significant period of time in Peja.

List 

Saint Sava, first Archbishop of the Serbian Orthodox Church and founder of the Monastery of Peć
Arsenije Sremac, second Archbishop of the Serbian Orthodox Church and first who resided in the Monastery of Peć
Joanikije II, Serbian Patriarch
Arsenije IV Jovanović Šakabenta, Serbian Patriarch
David Albahari, Serbian author
Mehmet Akif Ersoy, Turkish poet, who wrote the Turkish National Anthem
Fatos Bećiraj, Albanian football player, who plays for the Montenegrin national football team
Faruk Begolli, Albanian actor
Qerim Begolli, signatory of the Albanian Declaration of Independence
Vladimir Božović, Montenegrin football player
Đorđe Božović, Serb paramilitary leader
Agim Çavdarbasha, former Albanian sculptor
Agim Çeku, military commander of the KLA during the 1999 Kosovo War, minister of Security Force of Kosovo
Salih Gjuka, signatory of the Albanian Declaration of Independence
Bedri bej Ipeku, Albanian politician
Bogoljub Karić, Serbian politician and businessman
Gezim Kasapolli, politician
Xhevat Kelmendi, singer 
Majlinda Kelmendi, Olympic, World and European judo champion
Distria Krasniqi, Olympic and European judo champion
Rustemi Kreshnik, Albanian kickboxer
Miodrag Krivokapić, Serbian actor
Shkodran Metaj, Albanian footballer
Rahman Morina, Albanian politician
Fadil Muriqi, former Albanian football player, part of the "Golden Generation" of FC Prishtina
Xhevdet Muriqi, former Albanian football player, part of the "Golden Generation" of FC Prishtina
Ranko Popović, former Serbian football player and a current coach
Kamer Qaka, Albanian footballer
Riza Sapunxhiu, Albanian politician
Zhuj Selmani, League of Prizren
Milutin Šoškić, former Serbian football player, Olympic champion
Dejan Stojanović, Serbian-Montenegrin writer
Pavle Strugar, retired Montenegrin general in the Yugoslav People's Army (JNA)
Sislej Xhafa, Albanian artist
Haxhi Zeka, Albanian national leader

Peja